Elbakyan may refer to:

Alexandra Elbakyan (born 1988), founder of Sci-Hub
Anna Elbakyan (born 1963), Armenian actress
Armen Elbakyan (born 1954), Armenian actor, director and producer
Arthur Elbakyan (born 1961), Armenian actor, theater, movie, television director, television host, producer
Edgar Elbakyan (1928–1988), Armenian actor